Afrixalus lindholmi is a species of frog in the family Hyperoliidae. It is endemic to Cameroon and only known from the holotype collected in Bibundi, in the coastal area of Mount Cameroon. Its taxonomic validity is in question.

Etymology
The specific name lindholmi honours Wassili Adolfovitch Lindholm, a Russian zoologist, herpetologist, and malacologist. Accordingly, common name Lindholm's Banana frog has been coined for this species.

Taxonomy and description
The tympanum is small but distinct. The specimen resembles a juvenile Leptopelis, but is evidently an adult because it has about one hundred eggs in its ovaries. This number is much higher than is typical for Afrixalus species, and Amiet (2009) suggests that the placement of this species in Afrixalus should be considered incertae sedis only.

Some specimens now recognized as Afrixalus lacteus were allocated to Afrixalus lindholmi before the description of A. lacteus in 1976.

References

lindholmi
Frogs of Africa
Amphibians of Cameroon
Endemic fauna of Cameroon
Taxa named by Lars Gabriel Andersson
Amphibians described in 1907
Taxonomy articles created by Polbot